David Firth (born 1982 or 1983) is an English animator and filmmaker. He created the Newgrounds animated web series Salad Fingers in 2004 and co-wrote the 2017 live-action feature film Kuso.

Early life
Firth was born in Doncaster, South Yorkshire, England. His mother, Rosemary Firth, is an artist. He began creating stop-motion animation when he was 13 years old, using Lego and other toys. He studied animation at the Hull campus of the University of Lincoln and further studied television and film.

Career
In July 2004, Firth created the animated web series Salad Fingers, which was released on Newgrounds. The series was created using Adobe Flash, and Firth became a notable figure in the medium of Flash animation. Ten episodes were released from 2004 to 2013, and an eleventh episode was released in 2019. Having accumulated roughly 110 million video views on YouTube as of 2020, the series is considered to have become the subject of a cult following.

Since his start on Newgrounds, Firth released several different flash animations, contributed animation to the BBC television series Charlie Brooker's Screenwipe, and voiced the character Shrimp in the third episode of the Adult Swim animated series Smiling Friends. Firth also co-created the comedy rapper character MC Devvo, a dimwitted chav performed by his friend Christian Webb, for a series of videos that satirised the music scene of Doncaster's white working class. In 2022, he contributed an animated segment to Justin Roiland's The Paloni Show! Halloween Special on Hulu.

In 2014, he created the animated music video for the Flying Lotus song "Ready Err Not", which Pitchfork described as disturbing and highly graphic. Flying Lotus referred to Firth as one of his favorite animators. Firth also co-wrote the 2017 body horror feature film Kuso, which was directed by Flying Lotus. In 2016, he created the animated short film Cream, which tells the story of a scientist who creates a miracle cream that solves all of the world's problems. It screened at Regent Street Cinema in London on 16 November that year and featured the voice of Flying Lotus. The two also co-directed the video for Flying Lotus's song "Fire Is Coming", featuring David Lynch.

Style
Ryan Ball, writing for Animation Magazine, describes his animations as "a brilliant and original hodgepodge of hilarity, stupidity and unshakable creepiness". Firth says that he "[takes] inspiration from the unpredictability of dreams", and describes applying this style as difficult because of the lack of spontaneity in producing animation.

References

External links
Personal website

Living people
Year of birth missing (living people)
English animators
Flash artists
Newgrounds people
People from Doncaster
YouTube animators
English filmmakers
YouTube filmmakers
English YouTubers